Sankeertana is a 1987 Telugu-language film, produced by M. Gangaiah under the Konark Movie Creations banner and directed by Geetha Krishna. It stars Nagarjuna and Ramya Krishna, with music composed by Ilaiyaraaja. It was released on 20 March 1987. The film was dubbed in Tamil as En Paadal Unakkaga. The film was later remade in Tamil as Deiva Vaakku.

Plot 

Keerthana is an orphan who is being brought up by a villager whose wife doesn't like her at all. Keerthana is learning dance from the famous teacher of the village. In this process, she falls in love with Kaasi, who belongs to a very low caste. The villagers believe that Keerthana is the goddess who came to save them and their village and hence Keerthana had lost her personal life. But now she has dared to love Kaasi and now she wanted to marry him. But will the village people allow their goddess to become a wife and what are the cruel consequences Keerthana and Kaasi had to face?

Cast 
 Nagarjuna as Kaasi
 Ramya Krishna as Keerthana
 Girish Karnad as Parameswara Sastry
 J. V. Somayajulu as Vasudeva Sarma
 Sarath Babu as Sravan Babu
 Sai Kumar
 Rallapalli
 Sakshi Ranga Rao as Rama Sarma
 Narra Venkateswara Rao
 Mallikarjuna Rao
 KK Sarma as Chidambaram Pillai
 Dham as Kodipetlu
 Y. Vijaya as Mahalakshmi
 Master Suresh as young Kaasi

Soundtrack 
Music composed by Ilaiyaraaja was released on ECHO Audio Company.

Accolades 
Nandi Award for Best First Film of a Director – Geetha Krishna

References

External links 
 

1980s Telugu-language films
1987 directorial debut films
1987 films
Films scored by Ilaiyaraaja
Telugu films remade in other languages